San Andreas is an archaic variation of the Spanish language San Andrés (Saint Andrew, the apostle).

It may also refer to:

Places
San Andreas, California, an unincorporated town
San Andreas Fault, a geologic fault that runs through California
San Andreas Lake, a lake near San Francisco, California for which the fault is named

Arts, entertainment, and media
San Andreas (novel), a 1984 novel by Alistair MacLean
 San Andreas (film), a 2015 film directed by Brad Peyton
Grand Theft Auto: San Andreas, a 2004 action-adventure video game

See also
San Andrés (disambiguation)
St Andrews (disambiguation)